Tekke, Kazan is a village in the District of Kazan, Ankara Province, Turkey.

References

Villages in Kahramankazan District